Peeking Heights was a Ferris wheel that opened in 2005 at the long-lived Mystic East area of Chessington World of Adventures Resort, where it provided views of the entire park and on a clear day a view of London, including Wembley Stadium.

It was relocated from Thorpe Park Resort where it was known as 'Eclipse' until it moved to Chessington. The attraction closed in September 2017 to make way for some new Amur Tiger enclosures in a new themed area called 'Land of the Tiger' which opened in 2018 and is a retheme of the parks 'Mystic East' area, the parks log flume attraction in this area called 'Dragon Falls' was also re-themed and re-named 'Tiger Rock'.

References 

Former Ferris wheels
2005 establishments in England
2017 disestablishments in England
Chessington World of Adventures past rides
Cultural infrastructure completed in 2005
Buildings and structures demolished in 2017